The eastern hog-nosed snake (Heterodon platirhinos), also known as the spreading adder and by various other common names, is a species of mildly venomous rear-fanged snake in the family Colubridae. The species is endemic to North America. There are no subspecies that are recognized as being valid.

Geographic range
H. platirhinos is found from eastern-central Minnesota, and Wisconsin to southern Ontario and extreme southern New Hampshire, south to southern Florida and west to eastern Texas and western Kansas.

Habitat
Studies have shown that H. platirhinos prefers upland sandy pine-forests, old-fields and forest edges. Like most of the genus Heterodon, the Eastern Hognose Snake prefers dry conditions with loose soil for burrowing purposes. These loose soils are preferable habitat components for nesting and egg laying. At the northern end of their range, they have been found to prefer developed lands as their desired habitat followed by mixed forests dominated by Hemlock trees. Based on a study in Canada, the average home range size is about 40 hectares. Some individuals will travel outside of their home range in search of mates and nesting sites.

Description and etymology

The average adult H. platirhinos measures  in total length (including tail), with females being larger than males.

The generic name Heterodon is derived from the Greek words heteros meaning "different" and odon meaning "tooth". The specific name platirhinos is derived from the Greek words platys meaning "broad or flat" and rhinos  meaning "snout".

The most distinguishing feature is the upturned snout, used for digging in sandy soils.

The color pattern is extremely variable. It can be red, green, orange, brown, gray to black, or any combination thereof depending on locality. Dorsally, it can be blotched, checkered, or patternless. The belly tends to be a solid gray, yellow, or cream-colored. In this species the underside of the tail is lighter than the belly.

Venom
Although H. platirhinos is  rear-fanged, it is often considered nonvenomous because it is not harmful to humans. Heterodon means "different tooth", which refers to the enlarged teeth at the rear of the upper jaw. These teeth inject a mild amphibian-specific venom into prey. The fangs receive the venom from the snake's Duvernoy's gland. Bitten humans who are allergic to the saliva have been known to experience local swelling, but no human deaths have been documented.

Common names
Common names for H. platirhinos include eastern hog-nosed snake, spreading adder, spread'em outer, hog-nosed snake, adder, bastard rattlesnake, black adder, black blowing viper, black hog-nosed snake, black viper snake, blauser, blower, blowing adder, blowing snake, blow(ing) viper, blow snake, buckwheat-nose snake, calico snake, checkered adder, checquered adder, chunk head, common hog-nosed snake, common spreading adder, deaf adder, eastern hognose snake, flat-head, flat-head(ed) adder, hay-nose snake, hissing adder, hissing snake, hog-nosed adder, hog-nosed rattler, hog-nose snake, hog-nosed viper, hissing viper, (mountain) moccasin, North American adder, North American hog-nosed snake, pilot, poison viper, puff(ing) adder, red snake, rock adder, rossel bastard, sand adder, sand viper, spotted (spreading) adder, spread nelly, spread-head moccasin, spread-head snake, spread-head viper, flat-head adder (spreading) viper.

Conservation status
This species, H. platirhinos, is classified as Least Concern (LC) on the IUCN Red List of Threatened Species (Year assessed: 2007). However, it is a species of increasing conservation concern, especially in the northeastern part of its range. Of the five states in the northeast U.S. where the eastern hognose snake occurs, it currently has "listed" conservation status in four (Connecticut, New Hampshire, New York, and Rhode Island). Noted declines are believed to be the result of direct anthropogenic pressures including habitat loss and fragmentation, road mortality, environmental degradation, and intentional killing.

Defensive behavior
When the eastern hognose snake is threatened, the neck is flattened and the head is raised off the ground, like a cobra. It also hisses and will strike with its mouth closed, but it does not attempt to bite. The result can be likened to a high speed head-butt. If this threat display does not work to deter a would-be predator, an eastern hognose snake will often roll onto its back and play dead, going so far as to emit a foul musk from its cloaca and let its tongue hang out of its mouth. One individual was observed playing dead for 45 minutes before reanimating and moving away.

Feeding
The eastern hognose snake feeds extensively on amphibians, and has a particular fondness for toads. This snake has resistance to the toxins toads secrete. This immunity is thought to come from enlarged adrenal glands which secrete large amounts of hormones to counteract the toads' powerful skin poisons. At the rear of each upper jaw, it has greatly enlarged teeth, which are neither hollow nor grooved, with which it punctures and deflates toads to be able to swallow them whole. It will also consume other amphibians, such as frogs and salamanders. Because it is a toad feeding specialist, its venom has been modified to be greatly effective against toads and has not been found to be harmful to humans.

Captivity
Eastern hognose snakes are occasionally available in the exotic pet trade, but due to their specific dietary requirements, they are not as readily available as other species. Generally, they refuse feeder rodents unless they are scented with amphibians. In Canada, Eastern hognose snakes are considered to be a species-at-risk (COSEWIC designation: Threatened), and consequently capture or harassment of these animals, including their captive trade, is illegal.

These snakes live for approximately 12 years. They shed their skin periodically to grow and develop.

Reproduction
Eastern hognose snakes mate in April and May. Females lay their eggs in small soil depressions, mammal burrows, or under rocks. Some females have been observed traveling past viable nesting conditions in order to reach communal nesting sites.The females, which lay 8–40 eggs (average about 25) in June or early July, do not take care of the eggs or young. They have an average nest temperature of 23-26 degrees Celsius incubating for an average of 49-63 days.

Gallery

References

Further reading
Conant, Roger, and William Bridges (1939). What Snake Is That? A Field Guide to the Snakes of the United States East of the Rocky Mountains. With 108 drawings by Edmond Malnate. New York and London: D. Appleton-Century. Frontispiece map + viii + 163 pp. + Plates A-C, 1-32. (Heterodon contortrix, pp. 39–40 + Plate 4, Figure 11; Plate 5, Figure 13).
Holbrook, J.E. (1842). North American Herpetology; or, A Description of the Reptiles Inhabiting the United States. Vol. IV. Philadelphia: J. Dobson. 138 pp. (Heterodon platirhinos, including synonym Heterodon niger, pp. 62–70, Plates XVI.- XVII).
Latreille, P.A. In Sonnini, C.S., and P.A. Latreille (1801). Histoire naturelle des reptiles, avec figures dessinées d'apres nature; Tome IV. Seconde Partie. Serpens. Paris: Crapelet. 410 pp. (Heterodon platirhinos, new species, pp. 32–37). (in French).
Morris, Percy A. (1948). Boy's Book of Snakes: How to Recognize and Understand Them. A volume of the Humanizing Science Series, edited by Jacques Cattell. New York: Ronald Press. viii + 185 pp. ("The Hog-Nosed Snake", "Heterodon platyrhinos ", pp. 52–57, 179).
Zim, H.S., and H.M. Smith (1956). Reptiles and Amphibians: A Guide to Familiar American Species: A Golden Nature Guide. New York: Simon and Schuster. 160 pp. (Heterodon contortrix, pp. 81, 156).

External links
Eastern Hognose Snake, Reptiles and Amphibians of Iowa.

Heterodon
Reptiles of the United States
Reptiles of Ontario
Fauna of the Great Lakes region (North America)
Fauna of the Eastern United States
Fauna of the Southeastern United States
Taxa named by Pierre André Latreille
Reptiles described in 1801